Paigah Tombs or Maqhbara Shams al-Umara, are the tombs belonging to the nobility of Paigah family, who were fierce loyalists of the Nizams, served as statespeople, philanthropists and generals under and alongside them. The Paigah tombs are among the major wonders of Hyderabad State which known for their architectural excellence as shown in their laid mosaic tiles and craftsmanship work. The Paigah's necropolis is located in a quiet neighbourhood 4 km southeast of Charminar Hyderabad, at Pisal banda suburb, down a small lane across from Owasi Hospital near Santosh Nagar. These tombs are made out of lime and mortar with beautiful inlaid marble carvings. These tombs are 200 years old which represent the final resting places of several generations of the Paigah Nobles.

At first, Paigah Tombs may look deserted and totally uncared for, but on a closer look, you will find the place quite enthralling. With marvelous carvings and motifs in floral designs and inlaid mosaic tile-works, the tombs are exquisite to walk around. The tombs and their walls are delicately carved and enclosed in pierced marble facades, some of them in rows and some with beautifully carved screens and canopies.

The place is easily approachable and is set amidst a labyrinth of concrete houses built around the 30 acres of property in which the tombs are nestled. They are almost obscure and a marvelous piece of artistry in marble lost in time. The Indo-Islamic architecture is a mix of both the Asaf Jahi and the Rajputana styles of architecture. You will also see décor in fabulous stucco work, representing the Mughal, Persian and Deccan style too.

History
The noble families of Paigah, during the 18th century were the most influential and powerful families of the Princely State of Hyderabad’s aristocracy are the descendants of the Omar bin Al-Khattab, Islam’s second caliph, comprising the area of their Jagirs to 4000 sq. miles. Their ancestor was Abdul Fateh Khan Tegh Jung who came to Deccan with Asaf Jah 1st and founded the Paigah nobility. He rendered service to the second Nizam, who ruled between 1760 and 1803 and received the highest position of Commander in chief with the title of Shams-ul-Umra, meaning the sun among the nobles. Their distinguished family background, their valuable services to the Nizam's generation and also matrimonial alliances with the ruling Nizams made them the highest ranking nobles next only to the Nizams. They Constructed several palaces in the City notable among them were Asman Garh Palace, Khursheed Jah Devdi, Vicar-ul-Umarahi palace and also the famous Falaknuma Palace, they were believed to be wealthier than the average Maharajah of the country and were the only ones to have the privilege of maintaining their own court, palaces, as well as their own private armies, which often numbered several thousand.

Abdul Fateh Khan Tegh Jung was the first who buried in 1786 at the place which later became the family Maqbara built as per the generations of the members of their families, mostly renovated by his son Amir-e-Kabir I (in the 1880s some additions were made by Sir Asman Jah, Sir Khurshid Jah, and Sir Vikar Ul Umra)., the tombs of several generations of the Paigah nobles include Abul Fatah Khan Shums ul Umra I to Shums ul Umra v, Sir Asman Jah, Sir Khursheed Jah, Sir Vicar-ul-Umra, Sultan ul Mulk, Lady Vicar ul Umra, Lady Khurshid Jah, Lady Asman Jah, Moin ud Dowla, Zaheer yar Jung, Zayd Yar Khan and other members of the Paigah Family.

The Paigah tombs are near to the Dargah of Barhana Shah Sahab are very delicate and splendor works of art in Mughal Provinces Style. Though these stunning tombs are strewn over 35-40 acres, tombs of the Paigah as who had married daughters of the Nizams and their spouses are confined to a two-acre site. It is this enclosure which is now known as Paigah tombs., are in the shape of chaukhandis with latticed panels but open to sky. As all the Nizam's tombs till the ascending to the throne by 7th Nizams were exposed to the sky, to emulate the tomb of Mughal emperor Aurangazeb, of whom the Nizam were the governor. So the Paigah nobles preferred their graves to be without any roof. It is as per the simple tenets of Islam. The surrounding beautiful structure of walls have latticed panels with geometrical and floral design. The delicate polished stucco work and Jali is art is tic which represents the general style of the period.

At The Mausoleum 
The sublime beauty of Paigah Tombs has enchanted many through the years. It lies just 6 km from Hyderabad making the location easily accessible. A cranked up signage stating the name will welcome you. As you step inside the compound you will be instantly transformed into an era where beauty and craftsmanship went hand in hand, even if it was to follow them in the after-life! Each step you take around the mausoleum will bring you closer to the exemplary craftsmanship with elaborately carved canopies and marble inlaid floral designs. The most fascinating aspect about the destination is that none of the designs are repetitive. Each of the Paigah noble’s tombs features something uniquely different and part of the wonder is in discovering the differences in the carvings.

It is a treasure house of intricately designed latticework. It fills one with such wonder to see the delicately carved wooden doors and window screens done in jaali (perforated) work. Even though there is little to seek beyond the tombs, one can spend hours here walking through its passages and enclosed areas. Photographers must come here to watch and capture the shadows which play on each tomb and its rich carvings.

Architecture and design
The style of architecture of the Paigah Tombs is an amalgam of Mughal and Moorish styles resulting in a unique synthesis. The crypts, made of lime and mortar, have intricate marble inlay work and stucco reminiscent of Granada and Seville in Spain. These tombs are magnificent structures, decorated in stucco work, and represent the Moghal, Greek, Persian, Asaf Jahi, Rajasthani and Deccani style of architecture which are unique specimens of extraordinary artistry that is ardently visible in the wonderfully inlaid mosaic work. The geometrical designs in the Paigah Tombs are unique and are perforated with screens with great craftsmanship. Which has been constructed by Amir e Kabir I (Details of which are available in the diary of the Viceroy and the letter written by the then Resident J.C Bayley to Nawab Salar Jung the then prime minister Informing him about important details regarding tombs on 10 March 1882 after the death of the Co-Regent and Amir E Kabir III Nawab Rashid uddin Khan Bahadur informing Sir Salar Jung that all the three Amirs wanted to perform the  Urs of their Grand Father and Great Grand Father on the same day, he advised The Prime minister to see to it that all three Paigahs perform the Urs ceremony at the same time to maintain protocol and to avoid a situation in which who would perform first could be discussed)Nawab Sir Asman Jah Bahadur, Sir Khurshid Jah and Sir Vikar Ul Umra later made some additions which included the chowkhandis of marble added by Sir Khurshid Jah (this was taken up when Sir Khurshid Jah  ordered 18 Chowkhandis over the shrines of Important holy saints all over India. The last addition was made by Lady Vikar ul Umra for herself and her son Nawab Sultan ul Mulk Bahadur Beside the tomb of Amir e Kabir III Nawab Rashid uddin Khan Bahadur. It is in Hyderabad. These structures are specimens of remarkable artistry showing itself off in exquisite inlaid mosaic work. Local people claim that the geometrical patterns of the sculptural features of these tombs are unique and not found anywhere in the world.

Restoration work is being undertaken by the Aga Khan Trust for Culture to restore the missing architectural features, replace faulty repairs, and fix structural cracks.

The Tombs 
The detail of the stuccowork on these structures is intricate. They have become extremely popular because of the geometrical features carved on them. Apart from the geometrical designs, the floral designs, trellis marble fencing, and canopies are also very intricate and beautiful.

The Tomb of Asman Jah and Begum Khurshid Jah attract maximum number of tourists. The structures are made of marble and were once adorned with precious and semi-precious stones which changed colours with the change of seasons. The Tombs are enclosed by a wall which is ornamented with lattice work and exotic floral and geometric designs. Each wall is done up differently with fruits, drums, serpents, flowers, vases, etc.

The mausoleums themselves feature differing designs but all have exemplary craftsmanship, utilizing elaborate canopies and marble fences done in trellis-work that are made up of geometric and floral designs. Arches fringed by smaller semi-circular arches–a feature unique to India–are also employed. Each of the Pagiah noble’s tomb feature something unique different and part of the wonder is discovering each of the difference. All of these are housed by walls that are intricately designed by a wealth of latticework and exotic designs.

Gallery

References

External links

Paigah Tombs in Hyderabad Pictures
Blog with good pictures and feature
Feature on Paigah Tombs
Photos of Paigah Tombs on HyderabadPlanet.com

Monuments and memorials in Hyderabad, India
Hyderabad State
Mausoleums in Telangana
Buildings and structures completed in 1787
1787 establishments in India